Acacia browniana, commonly known as Brown's wattle, is a shrub of the genus Acacia and the subgenus Pulchellae. It is native to an area in the South West and Peel regions of Western Australia.

Description
The pinnae form in pairs along the branchlet. It blooms from May to November and produces cream-yellow flowers. Each inflorescence is simple forming one or two per axil. The heads have a globular shape that is sometimes obloid with a diameter of  composed of 12 to 21 flowers.

Classification
The species was first formally described by the botanist Heinrich Wendland in 1819 as part of the work Flora: oder Allgemeine Botanischer Zeitund. Synonyms for this species include Acacia strigosa and Racosperma brownianum.

There are five varieties:
 Acacia browniana var. browniana
 Acacia browniana var. endlicheri
 Acacia browniana var. glaucescens
 Acacia browniana var. intermedia
 Acacia browniana var. obscura

Distribution
The plant is found in  wet areas, near such as around streams and rivers, also on flats and ridges, hills and among granite outcrops in south western Western Australia from around Bindoon and Mogumber in the north around the coast to Augusta in the south  and Manypeaks. It grows well in sandy, loamy, gravelly soils often containing laterite.

See also
List of Acacia species

References

browniana
Acacias of Western Australia
Plants described in 1819
Taxa named by Heinrich Wendland